is a music publishing company based in Shinjuku, Tokyo, in Japan. Zen-On publishes sheet music for sale and rental, including orchestral scores, band and wind ensemble music, solo works and contemporary works, such as Frederic Rzewski's "People United ..." The company was founded in 1931.

Zen-On are also responsible for the publications of Asian classical composers, such as Joe Hisaishi.

External links
Website

Japanese companies established in 1931
Publishing companies established in 1931
Music publishing companies
Music organizations based in Japan
Shinjuku